Kawran Bazar Pragati Sangha is a football team from Dhaka, Bangladesh. It is currently a team of Bangladesh Championship League (BCL). Kawran Bazar gained promotion from the Dhaka League in 2020.

History
Kawran Bazar Pragti Sangh, which was established around 1985, and carries out their club activities at the Kawran Bazar Panchstara Sahandya Artaddar Bahumukhi Cooperative association club house, under president Mosharraf Hossain. The club were crowned champions of the 2018–19 Dhaka Senior Division League, thus gaining promotion to the Bangladesh Championship League, which is the country's second-tier.

Match-fixing allegation
In March 2022, investigations revealed that the club involved in Match fixing, as evidence was found against coaches, managers and footballers of the team. The clubs authorities and staff were involved in online gambling event, and according to reports the players were given a reward of 50,000 TK if they played according to the bettor's instructions, during the 2021–22 Bangladesh Championship League season. The prices were fixed in separate categories from footballers to coaches-managers and others.

Mosharraf Hossain, the clubs president, responded to the accusations "I don't know anything about this. If something like that happens, action will be taken." Within a few days after the allegations, the club sacked coach Rezaul Haque Jamal. During the same league season, many other Championship League clubs were accused of Spot-fixing.

Bangladesh Football Federation announced that they would start their own investigation about the Match fixing allegations imposed on the Bangladesh Championship League clubs, as soon as the league season ended, In June 2022.

Current players
Kawran Bazar PS squad for 2021–22 season.

Head coach

Honours

League
 Dhaka Senior Division Football League
Winners (1): 2018–19

References

Football clubs in Bangladesh
Sport in Bangladesh
Dhaka